Pune Pistons was a badminton franchise owned by Mohit Burman (Dabur Group) & Savan Daru for the Indian Badminton League. The team's home ground was the Shree Shiv Chhatrapati Sports Complex in Pune. The team was captained by Ashwini Ponnappa.
The team participated in the league only in the inaugural season.

Current squad

2013 season

League stage

Pune Pistons finished the 3rd in the group stage, qualifying for the semi final.

Semi-final
Pune Pistons were beaten by Hyderabad HotShots in semi final of Indian Badminton League.

 Ajay Jayaram (HH) beat Tien Minh Nyugen (PP), 21 - 17, 21 – 11.
 Saina Nehwal (HH) beat Juliane Schenk (PP), 21 – 10, 19 – 21, 11 – 8.
 Goh V Shem and Lim Khim Wah (HH) beat Joachim Fischer Nielsen and Sanave Thomas (PP), 16 – 21, 21 -14, 11 – 7.

References

External links
Badminton Equipment Serious Badminton Players Need
Badminton Kit Bag Equipments Serious Badminton Players Need

Sport in Pune
Premier Badminton League teams
2013 establishments in Maharashtra
Sports clubs established in 2013